Cassinia decipiens is a species of flowering plant in the family Asteraceae and is endemic central New South Wales. It is a shrub with woolly-hairy young twigs, spreading, cylindrical leaves, and heads of creamy-brown to yellowish flowers arranged in a rounded cyme.

Description
The upper surface of the leaves is glossy dark green and the lower surface is hidden by the rolled edges. The heads are arranged in a rounded cyme of several hundred florets.

Taxonomy and naming
Cassinia decipiens was first formally described in 2004 by Anthony Edward Orchard in Australian Systematic Botany from specimens he collected near Rylstone in 2004.

Distribution and habitat
This species of Cassinia grows in forest and woodland in a small area between to Goulburn River and Rylstone on the Central Western Slopes of New South Wales.

References

decipiens
Asterales of Australia
Flora of New South Wales
Plants described in 2004